is a 1986 video game software developed and published by Hudson Soft for the Family Computer exclusively in Japan. It is based on Fujiko F. Fujio's (the pen name of Hiroshi Fujimoto) Japanese manga series of the same name, which later became an anime series and Asian franchise. It was the tenth best selling Famicom game released in 1986, selling approximately 1,150,000 copies in its lifetime. It is the third game created for the Doraemon license after the versions created for the Arcadia 2001 and the Epoch Cassette Vision. Even though the game is completely playable by a player with no knowledge of Japanese, ROM translator Neokid and Sky Yoshi released an English translation patch for the game but both are completely different.

Gameplay
In this game, Doraemon must travel through three different chapters in order to save Nobita and his friends, who have all been kidnapped. Each world is actually a different game with its own style of genre and game play system, and was designed by a different lead designer. The first chapter is an action game that takes place in a pioneer that scrolls continuously in four directions. The second chapter is a shooter game that scrolls through the evil den automatically in both horizontal and vertical directions. The third chapter is an aquatic adventure game where each screen scrolls over to the next. Each world must be completed by defeating a boss at the end. Then the player will advance to the next chapter, until all three bosses have been vanquished. Power-ups can be obtained in each chapter to increase Doraemon's strength and health meter. One power-up from the next chapter can be found in the first two chapters to give you an advantage when you finally arrive there.

References

External links
 Neokid's translation patch at RomHacking
 Sky Yoshi's translation patch at RomHacking

1986 video games
Action video games
Doraemon video games
Hudson Soft games
Japan-exclusive video games
Nintendo Entertainment System games
Nintendo Entertainment System-only games
Shoot 'em ups
Video games developed in Japan
Video games scored by Jun Chikuma